During the 2004–05 season, the Scottish football club :Gretna F.C. became champions of the :Scottish Third Division. The team reached the quarterfinal round of the :Scottish Challenge Cup, and the third round of the :Scottish Cup.

Results

Scottish Third Division

Final Table

Scottish League Cup

Scottish Challenge Cup

Scottish Cup

References

Gretna F.C. seasons
Gretna